Hilbre High School is a co-educational secondary school and sixth form with academy status located in Newton, a suburb of West Kirby on the Wirral Peninsula, England.

The school has a drama studio theatre and many other drama classrooms funded by the school's specialist Humanities College status. This facility includes a lighting and sound booth which can be used as a recording studio. The school also has a sixth form block. Hilbre High School also has a music block, commonly known to pupils as A block, the main building, and D block.

Notable former pupils
Paul Humphreys, musician known for his work as part of OMD
 Daniel Craig, actor
 Chris Boardman, Olympic gold medal winning cyclist
 The Coral, musicians
 Paul Linwood, Fleetwood Town F.C. player
 Miles Kane, musician and one half of The Last Shadow Puppets
 The Rascals, musicians
 Joe Collister, Tranmere Rovers F.C. goalkeeper
 Sam Hughes, Leicester FC.

References

External links
 Hilbre High School
 West Wirral Works

Secondary schools in the Metropolitan Borough of Wirral
Academies in the Metropolitan Borough of Wirral

Specialist humanities colleges in England